The Oxford University Science Area in Oxford, England, is where most of the science departments at the University of Oxford are located.

Overview
The main part of the Science Area is located to the south of the University Parks and to the north of South Parks Road, bounded by Parks Road to the west. Some departments are also located south of South Parks Road. Close by to the northwest, further departments are located in a triangle of land bounded by the Banbury Road to the west, Keble Road to the south, and Parks Road to the northeast, opposite the University Parks, known locally as the Keble Road Triangle.

History
The Oxford University Museum of Natural History opened on Parks Road in 1860. Several science departments moved within the building—astronomy, geometry, experimental physics, mineralogy, chemistry, geology, zoology, anatomy, physiology and medicine. As the departments grew in size over the years, they moved to new locations along South Parks Road.

The Radcliffe Observatory Quarter further to the west between Woodstock Road and Walton Street, where the Radcliffe Infirmary hospital used to be located, is now being developed by the University for a number of departments, following the granting of planning permission in 2009.

Redevelopment
The new Biochemistry Building was designed by Hawkins\Brown, architects. Terra Firma landscape architects worked with them to design the new public interest and external facilities required by staff, researchers and students.

Departments
 Biochemistry
 Chemistry:
 Chemistry Research Laboratory
 Chemical Biology
 Inorganic Chemistry Laboratory
 Organic Chemistry
 Physical and Theoretical Chemistry Laboratory 
 Computer Science (formerly the Computing Laboratory):
 Numerical Analysis Group
 Programming Research Group
 Earth Sciences
 Engineering Science
 E-Research Centre
 Experimental Psychology
 Oxford University Centre for the Environment
 Materials
 Mathematical Institute
 Pathology, Sir William Dunn School of
 Pharmacology
 Physics:
 Astrophysics
 Atmospheric, Oceanic and Planetary Physics 
 Clarendon Laboratory:
 Atomic and Laser Physics
 Condensed Matter Physics
 Particle Physics
 Theoretical Physics
 Physiology, Anatomy & Genetics
 Plant Sciences
 Research Laboratory for Archaeology and History of Art
 Zoology

See also
 Begbroke Science Park
 Dyson Perrins Laboratory
 Oxford Internet Institute
 Oxford Science Park
 Radcliffe Observatory Quarter

References

External links
 Departments in the Science Area
 Science Area Team
 Department A-Z
 BK Marketing Solutions - Digital Agency website

Year of establishment missing
Science and technology in Oxfordshire
Science Area
University of Oxford sites
Areas of Oxford